In Brazil, Black Awareness Day or Black Consciousness Day is observed annually on November 20 as a day "to celebrate a regained awareness by the black community about their great worth and contribution to the country".

Black Awareness Day has been celebrated since the 1960s and has amplified its events in the last few years. Originally, it was celebrated on May 13 (the date of abolition of slavery in Brazil). It was later moved to November 20 to honour Zumbi's death, and is sometimes called Zumbi Day. It is an official state holiday in Alagoas, Amazonas, Amapá, Mato Grosso and Rio de Janeiro, and marked elsewhere by multiple city councils.

Events 
Members of the organization "Black Movement" (the largest of its kind in Brazil) organize educational and fun events involving mainly children of African descent. Their focus during these events is to dissolve the perception of Africans' inferiority in society. Other "hot topics" in the Black community during the Day of Black Awareness are the assimilation of African-Brazilian laborers with Caucasian-Brazilian and other laborers, ethnic identity, and black pride.

Similar days celebrating racial groups in Brazil

The "Day of the Caboclo" (Dia do Caboclo) is observed annually on June 24, in celebration of the contributions and identity of the original caboclos and their descendants. This date is an official public holiday in the State of Amazonas.

"Mixed Race Day" (Dia do Mestiço) is observed annually on June 27, three days after the Day of the Caboclo, in celebration of all mixed-race Brazilians, including the caboclos. The date is an official public holiday in three Brazilian states.

"Indian Day" (Dia do Índio), observed annually on April 19, recognizes and honours the indigenous peoples of Brazil.

See also
Black History Month, United States, UK, Ireland, The Netherlands
Afro-Colombian Day, Colombia

References

Afro-Brazilian culture
Public holidays in Brazil
November observances
Civil awareness days